A majority of elimination round games are held in the Smart Araneta Coliseum. SM Mall of Asia Arena in Pasay is an alternative venue when the Smart Araneta Coliseum is unavailable. Playoff games are exclusively held at venues in Metro Manila, mostly at the Smart Araneta Coliseum.

Provincial games are held on selected locations throughout the country, with most of the games held on a Saturday. Very rarely does a playoff game is held outside Metro Manila, if at all.

All-Star games, on the other hand, are currently rotated between Luzon and Visayas/Mindanao. Metro Manila last hosted the all-star game in 2016; Baguio and La Union jointly co-hosted the All-Star Weekend for 2007. Bacolod hosted the 2008 edition which ran from April 24–27, 2008.

Seven games had been held overseas: three at Dubai and one each at Jakarta, Indonesia, Singapore, Hong Kong, China and Guam.

Main venues

Alternate venues
The venues mentioned below are used when the Smart Araneta Coliseum and SM Mall of Asia Arena are unavailable.

Former venues used around and nearby Metro Manila

Provincial games

Elimination/classification round games

Luzon

Visayas

Mindanao

Playoff games

Games held outside the Philippines

References

External links

Venues
Philippine Basketball Association